Peter Rahn (born 12 October 1953) is a Swiss rower. He competed in the men's coxed four event at the 1980 Summer Olympics.

References

1953 births
Living people
Swiss male rowers
Olympic rowers of Switzerland
Rowers at the 1980 Summer Olympics
Place of birth missing (living people)